Qareh Daraq (also known as Ghareh Daragh, Qara Darreh, Qareh Dareh, and Qareh Darreh) is a village in Nowjeh Mehr Rural District, Siah Rud District, Jolfa County, East Azerbaijan Province, Iran. At the 2006 census, its population was 14, in 4 families.

References 

Populated places in Jolfa County